The Finnish Landrace, also called the Finngoat (Finnish: Suomenvuohi), is a landrace breed of goat originating in western Finland. The breed can come in a variety of colors but is usually grey, pied, or white, and both horned and polled individuals occur. Finnish Landrace goats are typically used for milking, as there is not a strong tradition of goat meat in Finnish cuisine, unlike in southern Europe. Finngoats are the only breed of goat native to Finland, and originate from native goats crossed with other European imports, especially from Switzerland.

See also 
 
 List of goat breeds 
 Finnsheep

References 

Goat breeds 
Dairy goat breeds
Animal breeds originating in Finland